Unified Diagnostic Services (UDS) is a diagnostic communication protocol used in electronic control units (ECUs) within automotive electronics, which is specified in the ISO 14229-1. It is derived from ISO 14230-3 (KWP2000) and the now obsolete ISO 15765-3 (Diagnostic Communication over Controller Area Network (DoCAN)). 'Unified' in this context means that it is an international and not a company-specific standard. By now this communication protocol is used in all new ECUs made by Tier 1 suppliers of Original Equipment Manufacturer (OEM), and is incorporated into other standards, such as AUTOSAR. The ECUs in modern vehicles control nearly all functions, including electronic fuel injection (EFI), engine control, the transmission, anti-lock braking system, door locks, braking, window operation, and more.

Diagnostic tools are able to contact all ECUs installed in a vehicle, which has UDS services enabled. In contrast to the CAN bus protocol, which only uses the first and second layers of the OSI model, UDS utilizes the fifth and seventh layers of the OSI model. The Service ID (SID) and the parameters associated with the services are contained in the payload of a message frame.gh

Modern vehicles have a diagnostic interface for off-board diagnostics, which makes it possible to connect a computer (client) or diagnostics tool, which is referred to as tester, to the communication system of the vehicle. Thus, UDS requests can be sent to the controllers which must provide a response (this may be positive or negative). This makes it possible to interrogate the fault memory of the individual control units, to update them with new firmware, have low-level interaction with their hardware (e.g. to turn a specific output on or off), or to make use of special functions (referred to as routines) to attempt to understand the environment and operating conditions of an ECU to be able to diagnose faulty or otherwise undesirable behavior.

Services 

SID (Service Identifier)

See also
On-board diagnostics, general article about diagnostic services in vehicles
OBD-II PIDs, about the US standard

References

External links
Unified Diagnostic Services - ISO 14229 (poster by softing.com)

Automotive technologies
Embedded systems